Sebastiano Galeotti (1656–1746) was a peripatetic Italian painter of the late-Baroque period, active in Florence, Genoa, Parma, Piacenza, Codogno, Lodi, Cremona, Milan, Vicenza, Bergamo, and Turin.

Born in Florence, he was a pupil of the painter Alessandro Gherardini, Felice Torelli, and Giovanni Gioseffo dal Sole. He collaborated with Giovanni Domenico Ferretti or Francesco Natali of Cremona in some projects, and among his pupils were Vincenzo Meucci.

He painted with Natali in the Oratory of Santa Maria delle Grazie, Parma.

He helped decorate with frescoes the rooms of the Farnese Rocca in Sala Baganza. Died in Mondovì working for the House of Savoy. He decorated the church of the Magdalen in Genoa. In Turin, he was appointed director of the Academy, the precursor of the Accademia Albertina.

His son Giuseppe was active in Liguria as a painter.

References

biography

1656 births
1746 deaths
17th-century Italian painters
Italian male painters
18th-century Italian painters
Painters from Florence
Painters from Piedmont
Italian Baroque painters
Academic staff of Accademia Albertina
18th-century Italian male artists